Mylohyoid can refer to: 

 Mylohyoid muscle
 Mylohyoid line
 Mylohyoid nerve
 Mylohyoid branch of inferior alveolar artery
 Mylohyoid groove